The Viking-class submarine was a planned class of submarines to be built by the Viking Submarine Corporation. Viking was a corporation jointly established by Kockums in Sweden, Kongsberg Defence & Aerospace in Norway and Odense Steel Shipyard in Denmark. Finland was an observer of the Viking project, as an eventual future buyer of additional Viking submarines. The idea was to develop modern successor to the Swedish , that would have cost about one third of the German Type 214. It was initially planned that the Swedish, Danish, and Norwegian navies would purchase two, four, and four Viking-class submarines each starting in 2005.

When the Royal Danish Navy announced that they would stop using submarines completely in the summer of 2004, the whole Viking project was cancelled. Currently Kockums is doing low-intensive continuous research, based on the Viking design, towards the A26 submarine for Sweden. 

In 2015 Damen Group and Saab Group announced that they have teamed up to jointly develop, offer and build next-generation submarines that are able to replace the current s of the Royal Netherlands Navy. It is speculated that the design will be derived from the A26 submarine.

References

External links 
 Official site (Kockums)

Viking